The 1904 Utah gubernatorial election was held on November 8, 1904. Republican nominee John Christopher Cutler defeated Democratic nominee James Moyle with 49.97% of the vote.

General election

Candidates
Major party candidates
John Christopher Cutler, Republican 
James Moyle, Democratic

Other candidates
William Montague Ferry, American
Joseph A. Kauffman, Socialist

Results

References

1904
Utah
Gubernatorial